Chunghye of Goryeo (22 February 1315 – 30 January 1344, r. 1330–1332, 1340–1344), born Wang Jeong, was the 28th king of the Goryeo dynasty of Korea.

Biography
He was remembered in the Goryeosa for his licentious lifestyle, particularly his habit of abducting, raping, and killing women. King Chunghye was the son of King Chungsuk of Goryeo and Queen Gongwon, a Hong. He is sometimes known by his Mongolian name, Putashiri, which is rendered in hanja as Butapsilri.

King Chunghye travelled to Yuan Dynasty China in 1328. In 1330, then-king King Chungsuk petitioned to abdicate the throne, and the emperor sent King Chunghye back to Goryeo to assume the throne. But in the following year, King Chungsuk returned to the throne and King Chunghye returned to China. In 1339, King Chungsuk died. One faction supported the noble Wang Go's claim to the throne, but their attempted coup failed and King Chunghye's reign was restored.
King Chunghye's queen was Princess Deoknyeong, who gave birth to King Chungmok.

After his father's death, Chunghye raped one of his father's concubines, Princess Gyeonghwa, who attempted to flee Goryeo. Chunghye imprisoned her in the palace. The Yuan emissary eventually visited the palace to visit Princess Gyeonghwa, who informed him of what had transpired. Then, the Yuan emissary arrested Chunghye and dragged Chunghye to Beijing. Chunghye was dethroned, forced to remain in the court of the Yuan Dynasty, and his son ascended the throne of Goryeo.

Family
Father: Chungsuk of Goryeo (고려 충숙)
Grandfather: Chungseon of Goryeo (고려 충선)
Grandmother: Consort Ui (의비)
Mother: Queen Gongwon (공원왕후 홍씨)
Grandfather: Hong-Gyu (홍규)
Grandmother: Grand Lady of Samhan State of the Gwangju Gim clan (삼한국대부인 광주 김씨)
Consorts and their Respective issue(s):
Princess Deoknyeong of the Yuan Borjigin clan (덕녕공주 보르지긴씨; d. 1375)
Crown Prince Wang Heun (태자 왕흔)
Princess Jangnyeong (장녕공주)
Royal Consort Hui of the Papyeong Yun clan (희비 윤씨; d. 1380)
Prince Wang Jeo (왕저)
Royal Consort Hwa of the Namyang Hong clan (화비 홍씨) – No issue.
Princess Euncheon of the Im clan (은천옹주 임씨)
Wang Seok-gi (왕석기)
Bayankhutag, Princess Gyeonghwa (백안홀도 경화공주; d. 1344) – No issue.

In popular culture
 Portrayed by Oh Hyeon-cheol in the 2012 SBS TV series Faith.
 Portrayed by Joo Jin-mo and Ahn Do-gyu in the 2013-2014 MBC TV series Empress Ki.
 Portrayed by Lee Deok-hee in the 2014 KBS1 TV series Jeong Do-jeon.

See also
List of Korean monarchs
Goryeo politics
Korea under Yuan rule

References

 

1315 births
1344 deaths
14th-century Korean monarchs
Korean Buddhist monarchs
Korean rapists
Korean serial killers
People from Kaesong